John R. Sloan (1912–2001) was a British film producer.

Selected filmography
 Brass Monkey (1948)
 Circle of Danger (1951)
 Twist of Fate (1954)
 Port Afrique (1956)
 Keep It Clean (1956)
 Seven Waves Away (1957)
 The Safecracker (1958)
 Beyond This Place (1959)
 Johnny Nobody (1961)
 The Reluctant Saint (1962)
 The Running Man (1963)
 Lost Command (1966)
 To Sir, with Love (1967)
 Fragment of Fear (1970)
 Dad's Army (1971)
 No Sex Please, We're British (1973)
 The Odessa File (1974)
 Force 10 from Navarone (1978)

References

Bibliography 
 Nik Havert. The Golden Age of Disaster Cinema: A Guide to the Films, 1950-1979. McFarland, 2019.

External links 
 

1912 births
2001 deaths
British film producers